The Wright Endeavour was a high-floor bus body built by Wrightbus from 1992 to 1993. The body was the first in what was to become the "classic" range of Wrightbus body style that was built until 2013. Only 35 were produced; 25 on Leyland Tiger chassis for Ulsterbus and 10 Scania K93CRBs for Yorkshire Traction.

References

External links

Coaches (bus)
Vehicles introduced in 1992
Endeavour